Zbelítov is a municipality and village in Písek District in the South Bohemian Region of the Czech Republic. It has about 300 inhabitants.

Gallery

References

Villages in Písek District